Hokusai is a rayed impact crater on Mercury, which was discovered in 1991 by ground-based radar observations conducted at Goldstone Observatory. The crater was initially known as feature B. Its appearance was so dissimilar to other impact craters that it was once thought to be a shield volcano. However improved radar images by the Arecibo Observatory obtained later in 2000–2005 clearly showed that feature B is an impact crater with an extensive ray system. The bright appearance of rays in the radio images indicates that the crater is geologically young; fresh impact ejecta has a rough surface, which leads to strong scattering of radio waves.

Hokusai is named after Katsushika Hokusai (1760–1849), a Japanese artist and printmaker of the Edo period. The name Hokusai was suggested by radar astronomer John K. Harmon. The crater has a diameter of about 100 km; the rays extend for thousands kilometers, covering much of the northern hemisphere.

Hokusai is the fourth-largest crater of the Kuiperian system on Mercury. The largest is Bartók crater.  Hokusai is one of 110 peak ring basins on Mercury.

References

External links

Impact craters on Mercury